Kanthar Nallathamby Srikantha is a Sri Lankan Tamil lawyer, politician and former Member of Parliament.

Career
Srikantha is an attorney-at-law. He is a member of Tamil Eelam Liberation Organization (TELO) and entered politics in the mid 1980s.

Srikantha was one of the ENDLF/EPRLF/TELO/TULF alliance's candidates in Jaffna District at the 1989 parliamentary election but failed to get elected after coming eighth amongst the alliance candidates.

On 20 October 2001 the All Ceylon Tamil Congress, Eelam People's Revolutionary Liberation Front, TELO and Tamil United Liberation Front formed the Tamil National Alliance (TNA). Srikantha was one of the TNA's candidates in Trincomalee District at the 2001 parliamentary election but failed to get re-elected. He was one of the TNA's candidates in Jaffna District at the 2004 parliamentary election but again failed to get re-elected, coming ninth amongst the TNA candidates. However, he entered Parliament in 2006 following the assassination of Nadarajah Raviraj on 10 November 2006.

In 2010 Srikantha left TELO and TNA. He subsequently formed the Tamil National Liberation Alliance (TNLA) with other dissident members of the TNA. Srikantha was one of the LLF/TNLA alliance's candidates in Jaffna District at the 2010 parliamentary election but the alliance failed to win any seats in Parliament. In June 2011 TNLA was dissolved and Srikantha rejoined TELO and TNA.

Srikantha contested the 2015 parliamentary election as one of the TNA's candidates in Jaffna District but failed get re-elected.

Electoral history

References

External links

Living people
Members of the 13th Parliament of Sri Lanka
People from Northern Province, Sri Lanka
Sri Lankan Hindus
Sri Lankan Tamil lawyers
Sri Lankan Tamil politicians
Tamil Eelam Liberation Organization politicians
Tamil National Alliance politicians
Year of birth missing (living people)